Rafael Calleja Gómez (21 October 1870 – 12 February 1938) was a Spanish composer, best known for the song "Adiós Granada".

References

1870 births
1938 deaths
Spanish composers
Spanish male composers